Śarabhanga (Sanskrit शरभन्ग) is a sage and anchorite mentioned in Book III (Aranya Kanda) of Ramayana. He is visited by Rama during the latter's journey through the Dandaka forest. Prior to Rama's visit, Lord Indra appears at his hermitage in order to take the sage to the heavenly Brahmaloka. Śarabhanga's last wish was to see Rama before leaving the mortal world. After seeing Rama and performing the necessary rites, the holy man carries out self-immolation by throwing his old body to the funeral pyre, and a youthful ethereal form rises towards the heavens. Before starting the rites, he asks Rama to watch him doing that.

References

Sages in the Ramayana